The Jugged Hare is a public house and restaurant at 49 Chiswell Street, between Barbican and Moorgate underground stations in the City of London.

The pub was opened on the site of an old Grade II listed brewery in 2012 by brothers Ed and Tom Martin, who also run The Gun in the Docklands and The Prince Arthur in London Fields, among other establishments. The decor includes oak flooring, red leather seating and a collection of stuffed and mounted animals.

Upon opening, it was reviewed favourably by restaurant critic Giles Coren of The Times, who called it "a very good addition to a good chain of pubs".

External links
The Jugged Hare website

References

Grade II listed pubs in the City of London